Cel-Xievionze Navarro (born June 23, 2006), better known as CX Navarro, is a Filipino child actor.

Filmography

Television

References

External links
 CX Navarro on Facebook

Filipino male child actors
Filipino television personalities
Star Magic
2006 births
Living people